Kuttikattu Sree Bhadra Kali Devi Temple is one of the Bhadrakali temples in Cherthala, Alappuzha district, Kerala. It is about 1 kilometer west of the Arthungal bypass of NH 47 at Cherthala.

References

External links 

Hindu temples in Alappuzha district
Devi temples in Kerala